Bradley Dial (born 1 April 1995) is a South African first-class cricketer. He was part of South Africa's squad for the 2014 ICC Under-19 Cricket World Cup. He was included in the Gauteng cricket team squad for the 2015 Africa T20 Cup.

References

External links
 

1995 births
Living people
People from Boksburg
South African cricketers
Sportspeople from Gauteng
Gauteng cricketers